This is a list of All-Ireland Senior Football Championship winning managers since 1986. The term manager (or coach) only came into widespread use in the 1970s. Up until then football teams were usually run by selection panels. Sometimes they contained up to ten members, resulting in self-interest coming to the fore more often than not. All this changed with the appointment of a strong manager, surrounded by a small group of selectors.

By year

See also
 List of All-Ireland Senior Hurling Championship winning managers

References

Managers
All-Ireland